Robert Ray Buhl (August 12, 1928 – February 16, 2001) was an American right-handed starting pitcher in Major League Baseball who played with the Milwaukee Braves, Chicago Cubs, and Philadelphia Phillies.

A native of Saginaw, Michigan, Buhl attended Saginaw High School. In his 15-year professional career Buhl posted a 166–132 record with 1,288 strikeouts and a 3.55 ERA in 2,587 innings. He pitched 111 complete games and compiled 20 shutouts. He was first signed to a major league contract in 1953 by Milwaukee Braves scout Earle W. Halstead.

Buhl compiled an 8–1 record against the National League champion Brooklyn Dodgers in 1956, en route to an 18-win season. He repeated as an 18-game winner the following year, helping the Braves capture NL pennants in both 1957 and 1958 as the third starter behind Warren Spahn and Lew Burdette.

In 1957, Buhl led the National League in winning percentage (.720), with an 18–7 record.

In 1959, Buhl won 15 games and led the National League with four shutouts. His most productive season came in 1960, when he finished with a 16–9 record, a 3.09 ERA and an All-Star berth.

In 1962, Buhl was traded to the Cubs after appearing in just one game for the Braves. He had 12 wins against 13 losses, a considerably better percentage than the 9th-place Cubs (59–103 .364) achieved overall that year.

He was traded to the Philadelphia Phillies in 1966 in a deal that brought future Hall-of-Famer Ferguson Jenkins to Chicago.

In 1962, Buhl failed to get a hit in 70 at-bats, the worst single-season batting performance in major league history. Baseball author Bill James named Buhl as the worst hitting pitcher of the 1950s. For his career, Buhl had a batting average of .089, with just two extra-base hits (both doubles) in 857 at-bats, for a slugging percentage of .091.

Fellow pitcher Sal Maglie observed, "Buhl gets wild when he's hit a little."

Buhl died in Titusville, Florida on February 16, 2001, just two days before the death of his Braves roommate Eddie Mathews.

References

External links

Bob Buhl at SABR (Baseball BioProject)
 Bob Buhl at Baseball Biography
Bob Buhl at The Deadball Era

1928 births
2001 deaths
Baseball players from Michigan
Chicago Cubs players
Dallas Eagles players
Hartford Chiefs players
Madisonville Miners players
Major League Baseball pitchers
Milwaukee Braves players
National League All-Stars
People from Titusville, Florida
Sportspeople from Saginaw, Michigan
Philadelphia Phillies players
Saginaw Bears players